In mathematics, a shelling of a simplicial complex is a way of gluing it together from its maximal simplices (simplices that are not a face of another simplex) in a well-behaved way. A complex admitting a shelling is called shellable.

Definition

A d-dimensional simplicial complex is called pure if its maximal simplices all have dimension d. Let  be a finite or countably infinite simplicial complex.
 
is pure and of dimension  for all . If  is the entire boundary of  then  is called spanning.

For  not necessarily countable, one can define a shelling as a well-ordering of the maximal simplices of  having analogous properties.

Properties

 A shellable complex is homotopy equivalent to a wedge sum of spheres, one for each spanning simplex of corresponding dimension.
 A shellable complex may admit many different shellings, but the number of spanning simplices and their dimensions do not depend on the choice of shelling. This follows from the previous property.

Examples

 Every Coxeter complex, and more generally every building (in the sense of Tits), is shellable.

 The boundary complex of a (convex) polytope is shellable. Note that here, shellability is generalized to the case of polyhedral complexes (that are not necessarily simplicial).

 There is an unshellable triangulation of the tetrahedron.

Notes

References

 

Algebraic topology
Properties of topological spaces
Topology